John Cook (1739-1815) was Professor of Humanity at St Andrews University from 1769 to 1773 and Professor of Moral Philosophy at the same institution 1773 to 1814.

Life
He was the son John Cook, minister of St Monans, who was born about 1711, and his wife Anne. They married on 11 March 1738. His mother, Anne, died on 12  February  1756,  aged  48. (His father was the son of Thomas Cook, merchant, Elie, and Christian  Gillespie. His father was educated  at Univ.  of  St  Andrews ;  licen.  by  Presb.  of Haddington  4th  Jan.  1732;  called  12th Aug.,  and  ord.  31st  Oct.  1734 ;  died  24 June  1751).

He succeeded to the estate of Newburn in Fife.

He died on 1 July 1815

He was Professor of Humanity at St Andrews University from 1769 to 1773 and Professor of Moral Philosophy 1773 to 1814.

He died in St Andrews and is buried in the churchyard of St Andrews Cathedral just west of St Rules Tower.

Family

In 1770 he married Janet Hill, sister of his colleague, George Hill. Their children included George Cook and John Cook, Professor of Hebrew at St Andrews.

His grandson (son of George) was Moderator of the General Assembly of the Church of Scotland in 1859.

References

Citations

Sources

1739 births
1816 deaths
19th-century Ministers of the Church of Scotland
Academics of the University of St Andrews
Moderators of the General Assembly of the Church of Scotland
18th-century Ministers of the Church of Scotland